Castellaniella hirudinis is a Gram-negative, rod-shaped, non-spore-forming, bacterium from the genus Castellaniella, isolated from the skin of a juvenile medical leech (Hirudo verbana) in Biebertal, Germany.

References

External links
Type strain of Castellaniella hirudinis at BacDive -  the Bacterial Diversity Metadatabase

Burkholderiales
Bacteria described in 2013